The Maitighar Mandala is a symbolic monument located in the heart of Kathmandu, Nepal. It is an island at the intersection of roads from Thapathali, New Baneshwor, Bhadrakali and at the southeast corner of Singhadurbar, the administrative centre of Nepal. It forms an important landmark in the beautification of Kathmandu city and a master piece of art depicting Buddhist relics. It also marks the initiation mark stone of one of the major highways of Nepal, Araniko Highway, that links Nepal with China.

History 
The Mandala was built in 2001 for the 11th SAARC summit in Nepal to showcase Nepali culture after clearing many multi-story buildings during the tenure of mayor Keshav Sthapit.

Etymology 
The name "Maitighar" literally means the "Parental Home' of the married women. Actually, there was a movie theater in today's Maitighar in the past, and a classic Nepal film, Maithighar (1966) was run for about a year. As there was a large poster depicting the name of the movie, people started calling the place as Maitighar.

The native name of the monument in Newar language is Fibwa Khya.

Symbolism 
The Mandala was designed to be in the form of a series of concentric circles. The outer-most has 32 vajras, the one next to it has 16 lotus petals and the inner has 32 garlands. Various colors on the Mandala (blue background, black, orange, and blue circles)  symbolize man's characteristics - too much of one would result in an imbalanced temperament. Black stands for  Krodh (anger), orange for Prem (love) and blue for Karuṇā (compasion). At the four corners of the mandala are symbols of the Ashtamangal.

Significance 
During the Nepalese Civil War, peace advocates gathered at the Mandala to show solidarity for peace and against violence.

Despite the government declaring the Mandala a protest-free-site, it continues to be one of Kathmandu's most common venues for rallies, peace vigils, protests and demonstrations.

Maintenance 
By 2010, the Mandala artwork fell into disrepair. In 2011, the Agriculture Development Bank, Nepal pledged to devote resources to restore the Mandala. The Mandala got a face-lift for the 18th SAARC summit along with the overall enhancement of roads in Kathmandu.

Gallery

See Also 

 Dharahara
 Garden of Dreams
 Ghanta Ghar

References 

Buildings and structures in Kathmandu
Tourist attractions in Kathmandu
Monuments and memorials in Nepal